Hyve Group plc, formerly ITE Group, is an international organiser of exhibitions and conferences. The Group organises over 130 trade exhibitions and conferences each year in 14 countries and employs over 1,200 staff in 17 offices worldwide. The company's vision is to provide the world's leading portfolio of content-driven, must-attend events delivering and outstanding experience and return on investment for its customers. It is listed on the London Stock Exchange.

History
The business was founded by the Shashoua family as "International Trade Exhibitions" (ITE) in 1991 and then launched a series of trade events in the new market economies of Russia and the CIS. It was first listed on the London Stock Exchange in 1998. In 2008 it acquired Primexpo NW LLC, a conference organiser based in St Petersburg and has subsequently acquired further businesses in Moscow (MVK), Krasnodar (Krasnodar LLC), Istanbul (YEMF and Platform Exhibitions), Kyiv (Autoexpo and Beautex), Mumbai (ABEC) and Kuala Lumpur (Trade Link).

The company rebranded from ITE Group to Hyve Group in September 2019.

In December 2019, Hyve acquired two US-based events: Shoptalk and Groceryshop.

See also
 List of companies based in London

References

External links
 

Event management companies of the United Kingdom
Companies based in the London Borough of Brent
Business services companies established in 1991
Companies listed on the London Stock Exchange
1991 establishments in England